Soma Orlai Petrich, aka Soma Orlay Petrich (October 22, 1822, Mezőberény - June 5, 1880, Budapest) was a Hungarian painter, born to a Serbian father and Hungarian mother.

Originally aspiring to become a writer, Orlai Petrich was a pupil of Jakab Marastoni in 1846. He attended Ferdinand Georg Waldmüller's school in Vienna beginning in 1847. He often painted historical themes and in his lithographs he portrayed experiences during the war of independence. He studied under Kaulbach in Munich from 1850. He painted "The Corpse of Louis II" in 1851, a decade before Bertalan Székely's painting on the same theme. He was also a popular portraitist.

References

External links 
 Artcyclopedia Entry

1822 births
1880 deaths
19th-century Hungarian people
19th-century Hungarian painters
Portrait painters
Hungarian people of Serbian descent
Hungarian expatriates in Austria
Hungarian expatriates in Germany
People from Békés County